List of governors of the Mexican state of Sonora since 1911:

2021–present Alfonso Durazo 
2015–2021 Claudia Pavlovich Arellano 
2009–2015 Guillermo Padrés Elías 
2003–2009 Eduardo Bours Castelo 
1997–2003 Armando López Nogales
1991–1997 Manlio Fabio Beltrones Rivera 
1991–1991 Mario Morúa Johnson
1985–1991 Rodolfo Félix Valdés
1979–1985 Samuel Ocaña García
1975–1979 Alejandro Carrillo Marcor 
1973–1975 Carlos Armando Biebrich Torres 
1967–1973 Faustino Félix Serna 
1961–1967 Luis Encinas Johnson 
1955–1961 Álvaro Obregón Tapia 
1949–1955 Ignacio Soto 
1948–1949 Horacio Sobarzo 
1943–1948 Abelardo L. Rodríguez, Party of the Mexican Revolution, PRM
1939–1943 Anselmo Macías Valenzuela, PRM
1937–1939 Román Yocupicio Valenzuela, National Revolutionary Party, PNR
1935–1937 Ramón Ramos, PNR
1931–1935 Rodolfo Elías Calles, PNR
1929–1931 Francisco S. Elías, PNR
1927–1929 Fausto Topete
1923–1927 Alejo Bay
1919–1923 Adolfo de la Huerta
1915–1919 Plutarco Elías Calles
1911–1915 José María Maytorena

See also
List of Mexican state governors
Politics of Mexico

Notes

References

Sonora